Darreh Panbehdan may refer to:
 Darreh Panbehdan, Marivan
 Darreh Panbeh Dan, Saqqez